The Seth Seelye House, now the Bethel Public Library, is a historic building at 189 Greenwood Street in Bethel, Connecticut.  Built in 1842, the house is gable-fronted, with four relatively slender Doric style columns in a portico supporting the gable-front pediment above.  A modern two-story wing extends the building to the rear.  It is a fine local example of Greek Revival architecture, and was built for a member of a leading Danbury business family.  (Bethel was set off from Danbury in 1855.)

The building was listed on the National Register of Historic Places in 1977.

See also
National Register of Historic Places listings in Fairfield County, Connecticut

References

External links
Bethel Public Library - official site

Buildings and structures in Bethel, Connecticut
Houses on the National Register of Historic Places in Connecticut
Houses completed in 1842
Greek Revival houses in Connecticut
Public libraries in Connecticut
Houses in Fairfield County, Connecticut
Libraries in Fairfield County, Connecticut
National Register of Historic Places in Fairfield County, Connecticut